State Security Service may refer to:

 State Security Service of Abkhazia
 State Security Service (Azerbaijan)
 State Security Service (Belgium)
 State Security Service of East Germany, most commonly known as Stasi
 State Security Service of Georgia
 State Security Service of Kazakhstan
 State Security Service (Nigeria), a Nigerian intelligence agency
 State Security Service (Uzbekistan)
 State Security Service (Yugoslavia) (1946–1991), the Yugoslav secret police organization
 State Security Service (FR Yugoslavia) (1991–2002), the security agency of the Federal Republic of Yugoslavia